Agglo Corporation Limited was a private Hong Kong based toy supplier founded in 1969. The company sourced toys ranging from low-price bulk products to large vehicle play sets.  Along with sourcing products, Agglo designed products in-house and developed packaging specific to customer needs.  In August 2022, the founder and CEO died.  Agglo Corporation ceased operations shortly after.

They were a donor to The Toy Bank charity.

In 2003, sidewalk chalk manufactured by Agglo was subject to a recall due to its high lead level.

References

Toy companies of Hong Kong
Toy companies established in 1969
1969 establishments in Hong Kong